Maybach is a German luxury car brand that exists today as a part of Mercedes-Benz. The original company was founded in 1909 by Wilhelm Maybach and his son Karl Maybach, originally as a subsidiary of Luftschiffbau Zeppelin GmbH, and it was known as Luftfahrzeug-Motorenbau GmbH until 1999.

In 1960, Maybach was acquired by Daimler-Benz. The name returned as a standalone ultra-luxury car brand in 2002, sharing significant components with Mercedes-Benz cars. After slow sales, Maybach ceased to be a standalone brand by 2013, and it became (in 2015) a sub-brand of Mercedes-Benz, which is owned by the Mercedes-Benz Group. , Daimler produces an ultra-luxury edition of the Mercedes-Benz S-Class and Mercedes-Benz GLS-Class under the Mercedes-Maybach name.

1909–1940: Early history
Wilhelm Maybach was technical director of the Daimler-Motoren-Gesellschaft (DMG) until he left in 1907. On 23 March 1909, he founded the new company, Luftfahrzeug-Motorenbau GmbH (literally "Aircraft Engine Building Company"), with his son Karl Maybach as director. In 1912, they renamed it to Maybach-Motorenbau GmbH ("Maybach Engine Construction Company"). The company originally developed and manufactured diesel and petrol engines for Zeppelins, and then rail cars. Its Maybach Mb.IVa was used in aircraft and airships of World War I.

The company first built an experimental car in 1919, introduced as a production model two years later at the Berlin Motor Show. Between 1921 and 1940, the company produced a variety of opulent vehicles, now regarded as classics. The company also continued to build heavy-duty diesel engines for marine and rail purposes.

Maybach had a British subsidiary, Maybach Gears Ltd, that specialised in gearboxes. In 1938, in conjunction with Dr Henry Merritt, they produced a gearbox and steering system – the 'Merritt-Maybach' – for the abortive Nuffield A.16E1 Cruiser tank design.

1940–1945

During the Second World War, Maybach produced the engines for most of Nazi Germany's tanks and half-tracks. These included almost all the production tank engines through Panzer I, II, III, IV and V, the Tiger I and II (Maybach HL230) and other heavy tanks: and also engines for half-tracks such as the Sd.Kfz. 251 personnel carrier and prime movers like the Sd.Kfz. 9. The engine plant was one of several industries targeted at Friedrichshafen.

After WW II, the factory performed some repair work, but automotive production was never restarted, and some 20 years later, the company was renamed MTU Friedrichshafen.

1960s
Daimler-Benz purchased the company in 1960. Post-1960, the company was mainly used to make special editions of Mercedes cars in the W108 and W116 model range, which were virtually hand built. These cars however carried the Mercedes badge and serial numbers.

Rolls-Royce Power Systems AG, based in Friedrichshafen, used to manufacture the commercial Maybach diesel engines under the MTU brand through its subsidiary MTU Friedrichshafen GmbH.

1997–2013

Daimler presented a luxury concept car at the 1997 Tokyo Motor Show. A production model based on it was introduced in two sizes – the Maybach 57 and the Maybach 62, reflecting the lengths of the automobiles in decimetres.

To promote the new Maybach line, Mercedes-Benz engaged figures such as Maybach heir Ulrich Schmid-Maybach and golfer Nick Faldo to serve as brand ambassadors.

Initially, Daimler-Chrysler predicted annual sales of 2,000 worldwide with 50 per cent coming from the United States; however, these expectations never materialized. In 2007, Mercedes bought back 29 US dealers, reducing the total from 71 to 42. In 2010, only 157 Maybachs were sold worldwide, compared to 2,711 similarly priced Rolls-Royces. By the time of the announcement that the brand was to be laid back to rest, 3,000 had been sold worldwide since the brand was revived in 2002.

Daimler announced in November 2011 that Maybach would cease to be a brand by 2013 and manufactured the last Maybach vehicle in December 2012. This was because of poor sales.

Cancellation
With poor sales and the heavy impact of the financial crisis of 2007–2008, Daimler AG undertook a complete review of the Maybach division, approaching Aston Martin to engineer and style the next generation of Maybach models along with the next generation of Lagondas. According to Automotive News, only 44 Maybachs had been sold in the United States in the first ten months of 2011.

An article in Fortune noted that Mercedes had missed out on the chance to purchase Rolls-Royce and Bentley when they were up for sale in the 1990s: "Mercedes backpedaled and decided it needed to be in the ultra-luxury business too, but it went after it in a remarkably clumsy way." It further stated that the first Maybach models had poor driving dynamics compared to its contemporaries from Rolls-Royce and Bentley: "Mercedes took an aging S-class chassis and plopped an absurdly elongated body on it ... rather than develop a new car from the wheels up, as BMW did with Rolls-Royce, or cleverly use the underpinnings of an existing model like the Volkswagen Phaeton for a new Bentley." Furthermore, Maybachs were never advertised as owner-driven vehicles, as the company believed that the luxury amenities would be sufficient to drive sales, and they even insisted that auto journalists (who usually test drive the vehicle) ride in the backseat.

Another suggestion for Maybach's struggles was that parent Daimler had failed to differentiate it from its Mercedes-Benz brand. While all three ultra-luxury marques share platforms and engines with other luxury brands from their parent auto company, Maybachs are built alongside the Mercedes-Benz S-Class flagship sedan, whereas Rolls-Royce and Bentley are assembled in England (separate from the rest of BMW and Volkswagen Group's respective production plants), and thus are regarded as being more "exclusive". Furthermore, the Maybach's pedigree was virtually unknown outside of Germany, unlike its British rivals which have long enjoyed renown worldwide; indeed the 2006 Rolls-Royce Phantom's interior evokes memories of a 1930s car while the Maybach 57S's inside makes no reference to its marque's history.

In November 2011, Daimler's CEO Dieter Zetsche announced that the Maybach-brand would cease to exist in 2012, making room for other models of the Mercedes-Benz S-Class. The Maybach-limousines were still being sold up to the year 2013, but after that, the name "Maybach" would not be used anymore. On 14 August 2012, parent Daimler AG announced the official discontinuation of Maybach by releasing a price sheet officially discontinuing the Maybach 57, 57S, 62, 62S and Landaulet. On 17 December 2012, the last Maybach vehicle was manufactured in Sindelfingen.

2015–present

Revival
The company announced that the line would be replaced by the next-generation of the Mercedes-Benz S-Class, Model W222, due for the 2014 model year, particularly the long wheelbase S-Class Pullman. An executive told a Frankfurt newspaper that "Daimler came to the conclusion that the sales chances for the Mercedes brand were better than that of Maybach."

Mercedes-Maybach

In November 2014, Daimler announced the revival of the Maybach name as a sub-brand of the Mercedes-Benz S-Class (W222), positioned as an upscale version akin to the more sporty Mercedes-AMG sub-brand. In anticipation of its April 2015 launch, the flagship Mercedes-Maybach S600 was unveiled at car shows in Los Angeles, United States, and Guangzhou, China, and the production model at the 2015 Geneva Motor Show. During the facelift, the S 500 and S 550 were redesignated S 560 and the flagship was renamed S 650.

Assembled on the same Sindelfingen line used for the S-Class, the model is targeted against the Bentley Mulsanne and Rolls-Royce Phantom. The Mercedes-Maybach will be available as S500 (S550 in the US) and S600 models, with 4matic all-wheel-drive optional with the V8 engine. The base car has several colour finish options and the choice between a three-seat rear bench, or two seats reclining. Options include: air-conditioned, heated and massaging seats; heated armrests; a system to pump scented, ionised air around the cabin; and a 1540 watt Burmester 3D surround sound system with 24 speakers. Maybach S500 assembly in Pune, India, began in September 2015, making India the second country to produce a Maybach.

Concept cars
The first Mercedes-Maybach concept car is the Vision Mercedes-Maybach 6, a large 2-door coupe with a fully electric drivetrain. The model was unveiled at the 2016 Pebble Beach Concours d'Elegance. The latest concept car is Project MAYBACH, a Mercedes-Maybach S-Class.

Models

Pre-war

 1919 Maybach W1: Test car based on a DMG chassis
 1921 Maybach W3: First Maybach, shown at Berlin Motor Show. Featured a  5.7L inline six.
 1926 Maybach W5: 7L inline six, 
 1929 Maybach 12: V12 precursor to DS7/8
 1930 Maybach DSH: Doppel-Sechs-Halbe ("half a twelve cylinder") 1930–37
 1930 Maybach DS7 Zeppelin: 7L V12, 
 1931 Maybach W6: Same engine as W5, longer wheelbase. 1931–33
 1931 Maybach DS8 Zeppelin: 8L V12, 
 1934 Maybach W6 DSG: Featuring a twin overdrive transmission system.
 1935 Maybach SW35: 3.5L  I6
 1936 Maybach SW38: 3.8L  I6
 1939 Maybach SW42: 4.2L  I6
 1945 Maybach JW61: 3.8L  I6

2 were the 5.7 L inline six engines built for and ordered by Spyker. Not all were purchased, and Karl had to build cars featuring the engines to offset costs.

Around 1800 Maybachs were built before WW II.

Engines
 Maybach HL120
 Maybach HL116
 Maybach HL210
 Maybach HL230

Post-revival

 2002 Maybach 57 and 62
 2005 Maybach Exelero (prototype shown at the IAA in Frankfurt)
 2005 Maybach 57S (the S standing for Special rather than Sport)
 2006 Maybach 62S
 2007 Maybach 62 Landaulet
 2009 Maybach 57 and 62 "Zeppelin"
 2011 Maybach Guard
 2014 Mercedes-Maybach S600
 2014 Mercedes-Maybach S400 (Only for China)
 2015 Mercedes-Maybach S500/S550 (US)
 2015 Mercedes-Maybach S600 Pullman
 2016 Mercedes-Maybach S 650 Cabriolet
 2017 Mercedes-Maybach S560
 2017 Mercedes-Maybach S650
 2017 Mercedes-Maybach S680 (Renamed S650 only for China)
 2017 Mercedes-Maybach G 650 Landaulet
 2019 Mercedes-Maybach GLS600
 2021 Mercedes-Maybach S480 (Only for China)
 2021 Mercedes-Maybach S580
 2021 Mercedes-Maybach S680

Performance
This rapid acceleration is noteworthy for cars weighing well over 6,000 pounds (2.7 metric tons). Maybachs in general are extremely powerful: the 57 has ; the 57 S, ; the 62, ; the 62 S, and the Landaulet, .

Features

Options for the Maybach 62 and 62S included 18-way power rear seats (replacing 14-way), power side and rear sunshade curtains, cooled rear seats, wireless headphones, electrochromic panoramic sunroof with solar panel for vehicle-off ventilation (replacing two choices of power sunroof) and interior partition with power, electrochromic glass divider.

Sales

Daimler announced in November 2020 that it planned to double its Maybach sales, based on strong Chinese demand, where the car is used as a limousine.

See also 

 List of German cars
 Maybach Foundation
 Maybach I and II, two World War II bunker complexes named after the engines
 Museum for Historical Maybach Vehicles

References

External links

 Maybach Comes to a Quiet End
 Maybach Manufaktur
 The Maybach Museum 
 A biography of Wilhelm Maybach (in German) 
 Technical information about Maybach engines in the Tiger I tank
 Maybach Foundation
 "Lockers Hold Spare Wheel Of Stream Line Auto", Popular Mechanics, October 1932, a streamlined auto made in co-operation with Junkers engineers, only one built
 Maybach S600 and 900, All About Cars, 2016
 Maybach Brand Review

 
Defunct motor vehicle manufacturers of Germany
Aircraft engine manufacturers of Germany
Car brands
Car manufacturers of Germany
Defunct consumer brands
Full-size vehicles
German brands
German companies disestablished in 2013
German companies established in 1909
Luxury motor vehicle manufacturers
Luxury vehicles
Mercedes-Benz Group brands and marques
Vehicle manufacturing companies established in 1909
Vehicle manufacturing companies disestablished in 2013